The 1972 World Series of Poker (WSOP) was a series of poker tournaments held during early May 1972 at the Binion's Horseshoe in Las Vegas, Nevada. It was the 3rd annual installment of the World Series of Poker, and also the 2nd one to feature the freezeout structure. In comparison with the previous year's series, the number of events was cut back and the buy-ins were raised, resulting in 1 preliminary event and the Main Event both having the same buy-in of $10K (equals about $54K in 2011 U.S. dollars). The preliminary event featured 5-card stud poker and was won by Bill Boyd, the same man who won the 1971 5-card stud preliminary event. The previous years' double champion Johnny Moss was defeated early in the main event and Thomas "Amarillo Slim" Preston went on to win the tournament after a series of deals.

Preliminary event
The preliminary event had a very small turnout, featuring only last year's 5-card stud champion Bill Boyd, and an unknown player. The event was played out on May 7, and Boyd relieved the other player of his money, cashing for $20K. Boyd went on to win 2 more 5-card stud events in 1973 and 1974 until 5-card stud was dropped from the WSOP slate due to waning popularity.

Main event
12 people were slated to appear at the main event, but due to reportedly attractive side cash games only 8 of them appeared at the tables on May 11th, the date the event was scheduled to run. Half of each player's $10K buy-in was covered by Benny Binion, who was looking to gain publicity from the event and thus draw bigger crowds into Binion's Horseshoe. The winner of previous 2 WSOP main events, Johnny Moss, took an early lead in the tournament, but soon ended up eliminated. Moss hit a set of deuces with 2-2 on a 9-7-2 flop and after a 10 came on the turn, he got all-in versus Doyle Brunson's pocket aces. However, Brunson hit a 3rd A on the river to win the hand. Moss had almost no chips left and got eliminated shortly afterwards.

With 4 players left on the 2nd day of the tournament, Amarillo Slim, the would-be champion, was very short-stacked with less than 2,000 chips. Beating Brunson's pocket 10 with trip 5s on a 5-5-3 flop, Slim made his way back into the game and soon saw Jack Straus eliminated. With only 3 players (Walter "Puggy" Pearson, Brunson and Slim) remaining, Jack Binion led news reporters and a TV crew to the poker table. At that point, Brunson and Pearson announced they did not want to win the event. Brunson was not only afraid of not being let in on future lucrative cash games if he were to be pronounced the world champion of poker, but also of a tax audit. The players struck a deal whereupon Pearson and Brunson would let Slim win the tournament, but in return they would take the cash value of their current chip stacks from Slim's prize.

Jack Binion was very cross with the outcome, as players openly changed their play to let Slim win. He held a meeting with the players in the Sombrero room of the Binion's Horseshoe, demanding that players resume fair play. Brunson laid out his reasons and Binion allowed him to withdraw from the tournament and cash his chips, while the reason for Brunson's departure was reported to be an stomachache. The sum that Brunson received in the end is disputed; some sources lay out figures as low as $20K, while according to Des Wilson, Brunson might have left the tournament with as much as half the prizepool.

After Brunson left, Pearson and Slim resumed play. According to Slim, Pearson was not content with the deal and was still trying to win the tournament, but in the end Jack Binion reportedly persuaded him to soft-play Slim and thus throw the match for publicity reasons. A flop of K-8-8 was seen. Slim pushed his 51K-chip stack in the pot and Pearson promptly called, both players getting all their chips in the pot. Turn and river (poker) were a deuce and an 8, respectively, and Slim won with a bigger full house. However, in the end, according to The Hendon Mob, Slim walked away from the table with winnings of mere $15K, only 3 times his investment.

Aftermath 
After winning the tournament, Amarillo Slim was invited to Johnny Carson's The Tonight Show on June 12 the same year. Slim later made 10 more appearances on The Tonight Show, an appearance on CBS's Hour, and a cameo in the 1974 film California Split. His life story inspired the Kenny Rogers's song The Gambler. Slim's large media exposure contributed to the recognizance of the World Series of Poker and the popularization of poker in mainstream U.S. media and popular culture. The next year's WSOP was covered by CBS and over 7,000 newspaper articles were written about it. Time magazine featured an article on Amarillo Slim with an excerpt about WSOP and rules of poker.

Notes

References

External links and further reading

Official World Series of Poker site

World Series of Poker
World Series of Poker